The  IIFA Best Background Score is a technical award chosen ahead of the ceremonies.

A. R. Rahman  is the most awarded artist with six wins followed by Pritam and Shankar–Ehsaan–Loy with three wins each.

The winners are listed below:-

See also 
 IIFA Awards
 Bollywood
 Cinema of India

References

External links
 2008 winners 

International Indian Film Academy Awards